The Diocese of Uyo is a Latin Church ecclesiastical territory or diocese of the Catholic Church in Nigeria. Its episcopal see is Uyo. The Diocese of Uyo is suffragan diocese in the ecclesiastical province of the metropolitan Archdiocese of Calabar.

History
 July 4, 1989: Established as Diocese of Uyo from the Diocese of Calabar

Special churches
The diocesan cathedral is Christ the King Cathedral in Uyo.

Leadership
 Bishops of Uyo
 Bishop Joseph Effiong Ekuwem (July 4, 1989 - February 2, 2013), elevated to Archbishop of the Roman Catholic Archdiocese of Calabar, the Metropolitan See, by Pope Benedict XVI on Saturday, February 2, 2013
 Bishop John Ebebe Ayah (Jul 5, 2014 -)

See also
Roman Catholicism in Nigeria

References

External links
 Official website of the Diocese of Uyo
 GCatholic.org page for this diocese
 Catholic Hierarchy

Uyo
Roman Catholic dioceses in Nigeria
Roman Catholic Diocese
Roman Catholic Diocese
Christian organizations established in 1989
Roman Catholic dioceses and prelatures established in the 20th century